Raygram Union is a union parishad situated at Kaliganj Upazila,  in Jhenaidah District, Khulna Division of Bangladesh. There are 21 villages and 17 mouzas in the union.

References

External links
 

Unions of Khulna Division
Unions of Kaliganj Upazila, Jhenaidah
Unions of Jhenaidah District